Pimampiro, also Pimampiru, is the seat of Pimampiro Canton, Imbabura Province, Ecuador. It had a population of 8,192 in the 2001 census and 9,077 in 2010. 

References

Populated places in Imbabura Province